Frank Bond (1863–1945) was a Canadian businessman and entrepreneur.

Frank Bond may also refer to:

Frank Bond (politician) (1856–1931), Australian politician
Frank Bond Centre

See also
Francis Bond (disambiguation)